"Who Wants the World?" is a 1980 single by The Stranglers. The song, about alien visitation to Earth, is regarded as a precursor to The Gospel According to the Meninblack album - which explored similar concepts in more depth. Like the band's previous single, "Bear Cage", it was a non-album track.  "Who Wants the World?"  peaked at No. 39 in the UK Singles Chart.

References

The Stranglers songs
1980 singles
1980 songs
United Artists Records singles